Regina Romero (born September 20, 1974) is an American politician. She is mayor of Tucson, Arizona, having been elected after previously serving on the city council. She is the first woman and first person of Mexican descent to hold the office since the 1870s.

Career
Romero was raised in Somerton, Arizona. She graduated from Kofa High School in Yuma, Arizona, and the University of Arizona. She earned a postgraduate certificate at the John F. Kennedy School of Government.

Romero worked as the Latino outreach director for the Center for Biological Diversity. Prior to her election as mayor, Romero served three terms as a Tucson city councilwoman, having first been elected to the city council in 2007.

Romero ran in the 2019 Tucson mayoral election. She won the Democratic primary in August 2019, defeating state senator Steve Farley and developer Randi Dorman. After winning the mayoral primary, her main general election opponent was Ed Ackerley, who was a longtime Democrat running as an independent in hopes of receiving conservative votes. She defeated Ackerley in the general election.

Romero is the first-ever female and first-ever Latina mayor of Tucson, and the first Latino mayor of the city since Estevan Ochoa, who was mayor from 1875 to 1876.

Personal life
Romero is married to Ruben Reyes, a district director for U.S. Representative Raúl Grijalva. They have two children.

Electoral history

City Council
2007

2011

2015

Mayoral

See also
 List of mayors of the 50 largest cities in the United States

References

External links

1974 births
21st-century American women politicians
21st-century American politicians
2020 United States presidential electors
American politicians of Mexican descent
Arizona city council members
Arizona Democrats
Hispanic and Latino American city council members
Hispanic and Latino American mayors
Hispanic and Latino American people in Arizona politics
Hispanic and Latino American women in politics
Living people
Mayors of Tucson, Arizona
University of Arizona alumni
Women mayors of places in Arizona
Women city councillors in Arizona